Rababi (Gurmukhi: ਰਬਾਬੀ) is a term used to refer to a player of the rabab instrument. 

In the Sikh liturgical tradition, there are three types of musicians—rababis, ragis, and dhadhis, all of which flourished during the period of the gurus. The descendants remained rababis to all the 10 gurus, keeping alive rabab music.

History
Indian temple art of the first century A.D. depicted the Gandharan lute, though the ancestor of the rabab in India is likely the Persian instrument of the same name. The rabab, in its various forms, proliferated throughout West, Central, South and Southeast Asia. Those  rababs used in Hindustani classical music of northern India are plucked.

Guru Nanak started the Sikh rababi tradition by engaging Bhai Mardana as his accompanist. The Muslim singers formerly called mirasi, were rechristened rababi by Nanak, because they played on the rabab. The last of the line of rababis was Bhai Chand. During the 20th century CE the instrument's use in Sikh kirtan was eclipsed by the harmonium but it has been revived. Sikh rababis used to perform kirtan regularly at Amritsar before the partition of India in 1947, after which many of the rababis migrated to what became Pakistan. The Sikh rabab was traditionally a local Punjabi variant known as the 'Firandia' rabab (Punjabi: ਫਿਰੰਦੀਆ ਰਬਾਬ Phiradī'ā rabāba), however Baldeep Singh, an expert in the Sikh musical tradition, challenges this narrative.

See also
 Balvand Rai
 Elias Rababi
 Sarod
 Seni rebab

References

Hindustani musicians
Sikh music